Kunnathur former state assembly constituency in Kanchipuram district, Tamil Nadu, India. It exists from 1962 to 1971.

Members of Legislative Assembly

Election results

1971

1967

1962

References

External links
 

Kanchipuram district
Former assembly constituencies of Tamil Nadu